Ambrose Madden, Chief of the Name, fl. after 1810.

A native of Eyrecourt, County Galway, Ambrose was the first O'Madden Chief of the Name known to reside outside Ireland.

References

http://www.rootsweb.ancestry.com/~irlkik/ihm/uimaine.htm
History of the O'Maddens of Hy-Many, Gerard Madden, 2004. .
http://www.ucc.ie/celt/published/G105007/index.html

People from County Galway
19th-century American people
19th-century Irish people